The Battle of Hoke's Run, also known as the Battle of Falling Waters or Battle of Hainesville, took place on July 2, 1861, in Berkeley County, Virginia (now West Virginia) as part of the Manassas campaign of the American Civil War. Notable as an early engagement of Confederate Colonel Thomas J. Jackson and his Brigade of Virginia Volunteers, nineteen days before their famous nickname would originate, this brief skirmish was hailed by both sides as a stern lesson to the other. Acting precisely upon the orders of a superior officer about how to operate in the face of superior numbers, Jackson's forces resisted General Robert Patterson's Union forces briefly and then slowly retreated over several miles.

Battle

On July 2, Maj. Gen. Robert Patterson's division crossed the Potomac River near Williamsport, Maryland and marched on the main road to Martinsburg. Near Hoke's Run, the Union brigades of Cols. John J. Abercrombie and George H. Thomas encountered regiments of Col. Thomas J. Jackson's Confederate brigade, driving them back slowly. Jackson accomplished his orders to delay the Federal advance, withdrawing before Patterson's larger force.

Confederate Order of Battle 
The following Confederate Army units and commanders fought in the Battle of Hoke's Run. The Union order of battle is shown separately.

Military rank
 BG = Brigadier General
 Col = Colonel
 Ltc = Lieutenant Colonel
 Cpt = Captain

Army of the Shenandoah
BG Joseph E. Johnston

Casualties
Estimates of casualties sustained during the battle vary. The National Park Service quotes Union as 23 and Confederate as 91 (without differentiating types of casualties).  Kennedy cites 75 Union deaths and 25 Confederate deaths. In his Official Report, Major-General Robert Patterson states the number of Confederate deaths as "over sixty" but does not describe Union casualties. One Confederate battle flag was captured by the First Wisconsin, but the surrendering Confederate regiment is not identified.
After the time for propagandizing the casualty figures ended, the following Union regiments precisely reported the sacrifices of their comrades-in-arms:
First Wisconsin Infantry: 1 killed, 5 wounded, 1 captured.
Eleventh Pennsylvania Infantry: 1 killed, 10 wounded, none captured.
Fifteenth Pennsylvania Infantry: 1 wounded, 35 captured (six of whom died in Confederate prisons within nine months).

In addition to the above, "The Official Records of the Union and Confederates Armies, 1861-1865" and "History of Pennsylvania volunteers, 1861-5" state the following casualties:

2nd US cavalry: 2 captured
14th Pennsylvania: 12 Captured (the 1st Virginia Cavalry took 47 prisoners from the company A, 14th and company I, 15th Pennsylvania)
McMullen's Rangers: 1 killed and 1 wounded (from the Sunbury American)

Total casualties for Union force: 3 killed, 17 wounded, and 50 captured

For the Confederacy:

1st Virginia Cavalry: 2 killed and 1 wounded
2nd Virginia Infantry: no record/report (casualties unknown)
5th Virginia Infantry 9 killed and 11 wounded

Total casualties for Confederate force (incomplete): 11 killed, 12 wounded

Aftermath
On July 3, Patterson occupied Martinsburg, but made no further aggressive moves until July 15, when he marched to Bunker Hill. Instead of moving on Winchester, however, Patterson turned east to Charles Town and then withdrew to Harpers Ferry.

Patterson's retrograde movement took pressure off Confederate forces in the Shenandoah Valley and allowed Brig. Gen. Joseph E. Johnston's Army of the Shenandoah to march to support Brig. Gen. P.G.T. Beauregard at Manassas Junction. Following the stunning Union defeat at the First Battle of Bull Run on July 21, the Union commander at Hoke's Run, Robert Patterson, was assigned popular blame without participating while the Confederate commander at Hoke's Run was assigned glory for his actions during the first major battle of the war.

Notes

References
 CWSAC Report Update and Resurvey: Individual Battlefield Profiles
 Gimbel, Gary. "The End of Innocence: The Battle of Falling Waters", in Blue & Gray, Volume XXII, issue 4 (Fall 2005). ISSN 0741-2207.

External links
Battle of Falling Waters

1861 in the American Civil War
1861 in Virginia
Manassas campaign
Battles of the Eastern Theater of the American Civil War
Union victories of the American Civil War
Berkeley County, West Virginia, in the American Civil War
Battles of the American Civil War in West Virginia
July 1861 events